The Alan Ball Local History Awards in the United Kingdom exist to recognise outstanding contributions in local history publishing (both in print and in new media), and to encourage the publishing of such works by public libraries and local authorities. The awards were established in the 1980s and are run by the Library Services Trust. They are named after the local history author and former chief librarian of the Harrow and Home Counties libraries. A maximum of three awards are made each year.

Awards
The following is the partial list of award winners.

2021 
 Hard-copy joint winner: The Picture of Yarmouth: 200 Years of Built Heritage. Published by the Great Yarmouth Local History & Archaeological Society.
 Hard-copy joint winner: Louise Ryland-Epton (ed), Bremhill Parish Through the Ages: The Heritage of a Wiltshire Community. Published by the Bremhill Parish History Group.
 Hard-copy highly commended: Lewis N Wood, Banstead War Memorial – 100 Years: An Illustrated histor y. Published by the Banstead History Research Group.
 Hard-copy highly commended: Clare Wichbold – Hard Work – But Glorious: Stories from the Herefordshire Suffrage Campaign (self-published).
 Community award joint winner: Alison Wilson with Anna Crutchley and Lilian Rundblad, photography by Faruk Kara, A Community Remembers: Histon Road (book with CD). Published by the Histon Road Area Residents Association.
 Community award joint winner: Nunnery Lane and Clementhorpe: Exploring Old Shops and Pubs in York. Published by the Clements Hall Local History Group.
 E-publication: South West Heritage Trails – Torbay Discovery Heritage Trail https://www.southwestheritagetrails.org.uk/. Published by South West Heritage Trust.

2020 
 Hard-copy winner: John Simpson (ed),  Managing Poverty: Cheltenham Settlement Examinations and Removal Orders, 1831-5 2.  Published by the Bristol and Gloucestershire Archaeological Society.
 Highly commended: Rowan Whimster, Ramsbury: A Place and its People. Published by the Friends of the Holy Cross Church, Ramsbury.
 Community award: Louise Wong (ed.), Crossing the Borders [Stories of the S E Asian communities in Manchester]. An NLHF funded project by the Wai Yin Society / Manchester University / Ahmed Iqbal Ulah RACE centre –  Manchester Central Library / Manchester Art Gallery.
 E publication award: Stroudwater History website – https://stroudwaterhistory.org.uk. Published by the Stroudwater Navigation Archive Charity.

2019 

 Delving along the Derwent: a history of 200 quarries and the people who worked in them, National Stone Centre.
 The Post War History of Leicester 1945-1962 (web site), East Midlands Oral History Archive.

2018 

A Swindon Time Capsule: Working Class Life 1899-1984. Highlights from the Dixon-Attwell Collection held at Swindon Central Library, by Graham Carter, Swindon Heritage, Local Studies (Swindon Libraries).
Poole, the First World War and its Legacy (web site), Poole Museum.
Bristol Old Vic Archive (web site), Bristol Bristol Old Vic Heritage, Amy Spreadbury.

2017 

 Miss Weeton, Governess and Traveller, ed Alan Roby; Wigan Archives.
 Spratton Local History Society website

2015 

 West Sussex Remembering 1914-18, eds. Martin Hayes and Emma White; West Sussex County Council.
 Buxton Museum Apps , Buxton Museum.
 Milford Street Bridge Project, Milford Street Bridge Project, St Edmunds Community Association.

2010
East Lothian Council, East Lothian 1945–2000, Sonia Baker (editor)
Epping Forest District Council, The Life and Art of Octavius Dixie Deacon, Chris Pond and Richard Morris
Nottinghamshire County Council, These Uncertaine Tymes: Newark and the Civilian Experience of the Civil Wars 1640–1660, Stuart Jennings

2007
Bedfordshire Women's Land Army (web site), Bedfordshire County Council, Stuart Antrobus
The Somerset Wetlands: An Ever Changing Environment, Somerset Books, Pat Hill-Cottingham, Derek Briggs, Richard Brunning, Andy King, Graham Rix

2006
Norfolk E-Map Explorer (web site), Norfolk County Council
Viewing the Lifeless Body, A Coroner and his inquests held in Nottinghamshire Public Houses during the Nineteenth Century, 1828–1866, Nottinghamshire County Council, Bernard Heathcote.

2005
Beyond the Grave: Exploring Newcastle's Burial Grounds, Newcastle City Council, Alan Morgan

2004
Am Baile/The Gaelic Village (web site), Highland Council, Interactive Bureau
Steam And Speed: Railways Of Tyne And Wear, Newcastle upon Tyne City Council, Andy Guy
The Shadow of the Gallows: Crime and Punishment on Tyneside in the Eighteenth Century, Newcastle Libraries & Information Service, Barry Redfern
Picture The Past (web site), Nottinghamshire County Council, Nottingham City Council, Derbyshire County Council and Derby City Council

2003
Kinder Scout: Portrait of a Mountain, Roly Smith

1999

Southwark: An Illustrated History, London Borough of Southwark, Leonard Reilly
City of Westminster
Leading the way: a history of Lancashire's roads, Lancashire County Council, Alan Crosby

1998

City of Newcastle upon Tyne, Richard Caddel and Anthony Flowers
Guardian of the Trent: The Story of Newark Castle, Nottinghamshire County Council, Pamela Marshall and John Samuels
Stockport: a History, Stockport Metropolitan Borough Council, Peter Arrowsmith

1997

All about Bede: the life and times of the Venerable Bede, 672 - 735 AD, City of Sunderland, Terry Deary
The History of Croxley Green Through Its Street Names, Croxley Green Parish Council, Shirley Greenman
The Lancashire cotton industry : a history since 1700, Lancashire County Council, Mary B Rose

1996

Contrasts in a Victorian city, Birmingham: sources and notes for a study of Victorian Birmingham, Birmingham City Council, Richard Albutt, Martin Flynn, Philippa Bassett, Jackie Inman
Working Children in Nineteenth Century Lancashire, Lancashire County Council, Michael Winstanley
William Morris at Merton, London Borough of Merton, David Saxby

1994

Essex Gold: Fortunes of the Essex Oysterman, Essex County Council, Hervey Benham
Durham Cathedral: artists & images, Durham County Council, Patricia R. Andrew
Merton Priory, London Borough of Merton, Penny Bruce and Simon Mason
Beardmore built: the rise and fall of a Clydeside shipyard, Clydebank District Council, Ian Johnston
Shropshire From the Air: Man and The Landscape, Shropshire County Council, Michael Watson and Chris Musson

1993

Romans on the Wight, Isle of Wight County Council
Riot!: the story of the East Lancashire loom-breakers in 1826, Lancashire County Council, Jim Walker
Newcastle's changing map, City of Newcastle upon Tyne, M Barke and RJ Buswell
The Wakes of Northamptonshire: A Family History, Northamptonshire County Council, Peter Gordon
Huddersfield: A Most Handsome Town, Kirklees Metropolitan Borough Council, EA Hilary Haigh

1992

I-spy the London borough of Sutton, London Borough of Sutton
Cinemas of Newcastle upon Tyne, Newcastle upon Tyne City Libraries and Arts, Frank Manders
Tameside 1066–1700, Tameside Metropolitan Borough Council, Michael Nevell

1991

Southwold River: Georgian Life in the Blyth Valley, Suffolk County Council, Rachel Lawrence
Old Runcorn, Halton Borough Council, H F Starkey
Waterways of Northamptonshire, Northamptonshire County Council, David Blagrove
A Fighting Trade: Rail Transport in Tyne Coal, 1600-1800, Gateshead Metropolitan District Council, G. Bennett, E Clavering and A Rounding
Archive Map Collection, Gateshead Metropolitan District Council, Les Turnbull

1990 

 The goodliest place in Middlesex: being a history of the ancient parish of Ruislip which comprised Ruislip, Northwood, Eastcote, Ruislip Manor and South Ruislip, Hillingdon Libraries, Eileen M. Bowlt [Author Award]
 Williams Barnes: The Somerset Engravings, Somerset County Libraries, Laurence Keen [Book Production Award]

1989
Author: Eileen M. Bowlt, Hillingdon Libraries
Book production: Somerset County Library, Keen

1988
Patrick Dillon & Wiltshire County Library

1987
Author: Helen & Richard Leacroft
Book production: Cambridgeshire Libraries, Storey

1986
Author: Eleanor & Rex C. Russell
Book production: Northamptonshire Libraries, Rowland Holloway

See also

 List of history awards
 British Association for Local History
 English county histories
 English local history
 The Whitfield Prize
 Wolfson History Prize

References 

History awards
British non-fiction literary awards
Awards established in 1986
1986 establishments in the United Kingdom
British local history